FGT may refer to:

Transport 
 Ascari FGT, a prototype race car model
 Faygate railway station, England (CRS code: FGT)
 Free Gauge Train, Japanese variable-gauge trains

Other uses 
 Finsbury Growth & Income Trust, a British investment fund (LSE ticker: FGT)
 Foster–Greer–Thorbecke indices, a family of poverty metrics
 Four-gamete test, in phylogenetics